Émile Edouard Charles Louis Digneffe (20 December 1858 – 16 June 1937) was a Belgian lawyer, banker, businessman, a Walloon activist and liberal politician.

He was alderman and burgomaster of Liège, a member of the Belgian parliament and President of the Belgian Senate from 27 December 1932 until 11 August 1934.

honours 
 1932: Knight Grand Cross in the Order of the Crown.

See also
Liberal Party
Liberalism in Belgium

References

Sources
Emile Digneffe
Van Molle, P., Het Belgisch parlement 1894–1969, Gent, Erasmus, 1969, p. 129.
Caulier-Mathy, Nicole, in : Kurgan-van Hentenrijk, Ginette, Jaumain, Serge, Montens, Valérie, a.o., Dictionnaire des patrons en Belgique. Les hommes, les entreprises, les reseaux, Brussel, De Boeck Université, 1996, p. 242–243.
D'Hoore, Marc, in : Delforge, Paul, Destatte Philippe, Libon, Micheline (ed.), Encyclopédie du Mouvement wallon, Charleroi, Institut Jules Destrée, 2001, 3 dl., p. 502–503.

1858 births
1937 deaths
Grand Crosses of the Order of the Crown (Belgium)
Presidents of the Senate (Belgium)
Walloon movement activists
Politicians from Liège
Lawyers from Liège